The freguesias (civil parishes) of Portugal are listed in by municipality according to the following format:
 concelho
 freguesias

Elvas
Ajuda, Salvador e Santo Ildefonso
Alcáçova
Assunção
Barbacena
Caia e São Pedro
Santa Eulália
São Brás e São Lourenço
São Vicente e Ventosa
Terrugem
Vila Boim
Vila Fernando

Entroncamento
Entroncamento

Espinho
Anta
Espinho
Guetim
Paramos
Silvalde

Esposende
Antas
Apúlia
Belinho
Curvos
Esposende
Fão
Fonte Boa
Forjães
Gandra
Gemeses
Mar
Marinhas
Palmeira de Faro
Rio Tinto
Vila Chã

Estarreja
Avanca
Beduído
Canelas
Fermelã
Pardilhó
Salreu
Veiros

Estremoz
Arcos
Estremoz (Santa Maria)
Estremoz (Santo André)
Évora Monte (Santa Maria)
Glória
Santa Vitória do Ameixial
Santo Estêvão
São Bento de Ana Loura
São Bento do Ameixial
São Bento do Cortiço
São Domingos de Ana Loura
São Lourenço de Mamporcão
Veiros

Évora
Bacelo
Canaviais
Évora (Santo Antão)
Évora (São Mamede)
Horta das Figueiras
Malagueira
Nossa Senhora da Boa Fé
Nossa Senhora da Graça do Divor
Nossa Senhora da Torega
Nossa Senhora de Guadalupe
Nossa Senhora de Machede
São Bento do Mato
São Manços
São Miguel de Machede
São Sebastião da Giesteira
São Vicente do Pigeiro
Sé e São Pedro
Senhora da Saúde
Torre de Coelheiros

E